Nicholas Courtauld Rayner (3 March 1938 – 21 December 2017) was a British Army officer with the 11th Hussars and later jewellery expert and auctioneer. In 1965 he briefly held the record for the Cresta run. He was head of Sotheby's Geneva office and received international publicity when he sold the Duchess of Windsor's jewellery collection there in 1987.

Selected publications
 The jewels of the Duchess of Windsor. Vendome Press in association with Sotheby's, New York, 1987. (With John Culme)

References 

1938 births
2017 deaths
People educated at Eton College
11th Hussars officers
People from Dawlish
British auctioneers
Sotheby's people
Jewellery designers
20th-century British Army personnel